The year 1521 in science and technology included many events, some of which are listed here.

Astronomy
 January – Antonio Pigafetta, sailing with Magellan's expedition, observes Magellanic Clouds.

Exploration
 Francisco de Gordillo explores the Atlantic coast up to South Carolina.
 March 6 – Ferdinand Magellan discovers Guam in the Mariana Islands.
 March 16 – Magellan reaches the Philippines.
 April 7 – Magellan arrives at Cebu Island.
 November 8 – Magellan's expedition, now led by Juan Sebastián Elcano, arrives in the Maluku Islands.

Medicine
 Jacopo Berengario da Carpi publishes Commentaria cum amplissimus additionibus super anatomiam Mundini in Bologna, containing the first printed anatomical illustrations taken from nature and including observation of the vermiform appendix.

Births
 Valentin Mennher, German mathematician (d. c.1571).
 approx. date – Richard Chancellor, English Arctic explorer (drowned 1556).

Deaths
 April 27 – Ferdinand Magellan, Portuguese explorer (born c.1480) (killed in the Philippines).
 July 8 – Jorge Álvares, Portuguese explorer.
 Francisco Serrão, Portuguese explorer.

References

 
16th century in science
1520s in science